The 1961 Giro di Lombardia was the 55th edition of the Giro di Lombardia cycle race and was held on 21 October 1961. The race started in Milan and finished in Como. The race was won by Vito Taccone of the Atala team.

General classification

References

1961
Giro di Lombardia
Giro di Lombardia
1961 Super Prestige Pernod